Jeff Dodson is an American former college baseball coach.  He served the head coach of the University of North Dakota baseball program from 2009 until it was discontinued after the 2016 season.

Playing career
Dodson played two seasons at Bevill State Community College, earning an associate degree in 1989.  He then played at Livingston University—now known as the University of West Alabama—completing his bachelor's degree in 1993.

Coaching career
In 1995, Dodson returned to Bevill State as head coach, a position he held for two seasons.  He compiled a record of 31–77.  In 1997, he moved to Martin Methodist College as head coach.  In seven seasons, he led the RedHawks to a 190–144 record and placed four players into the professional ranks.  In 2004, he moved to Southeast Missouri State as an assistant coach.  He served as recruiting coordinator and pitching coach for five seasons.  After the 2008 season, Dodson was named head coach at North Dakota, managing the transition to Division I.  He led the program into the Great West Conference and later the Western Athletic Conference.

He led the Fighting Sioux to a winning season in 2013, as well as a winning record in the WAC in 2015 and a trip to the conference tournament. However, the team sank to an 8-37 record in 2016. On April 12, 2016, the University of North Dakota announced the baseball program would be discontinued at the end of the 2016 season. The elimination of the North Dakota program ended Dodson's college coaching career.

Head coaching record
This table shows Dodson's record as a head coach at the Division I level.

References

Year of birth missing (living people)
Living people
Bevill State Bears baseball coaches
Bevill State Bears baseball players
Emporia State University alumni
UT Southern FireHawks baseball coaches
North Dakota Fighting Hawks baseball coaches
Southeast Missouri State Redhawks baseball coaches
West Alabama Tigers baseball players